Aberedw railway station served the village of Aberedw in Powys, Wales. Aberedw Castle was demolished to build the station and some of the stone from the castle was used as track ballast.

History
Opened by the Mid Wales Railway, then operated by the Cambrian Railways, it became part of the Great Western Railway. Passing on to the Western Region of British Railways on nationalisation in 1948, it was then closed by the British Transport Commission.

Author Shaun Sewell quotes a diarist as writing about the station, in 1877, that the reader should "Please imagine a wooden hut about 12 feet long ... divided by a partition ... and he will have a very good idea of Aberedw Railway Station".

References 

 Aberedw station on navigable O. S. map

Further reading

Disused railway stations in Powys
Railway stations in Great Britain opened in 1867
Railway stations in Great Britain closed in 1962
Former Cambrian Railway stations
1869 establishments in Wales
1962 disestablishments in Wales